Rib Lake is an unincorporated place and railway point in the town of Latchford, Timiskaming District, Northeastern Ontario, Canada. It is in geographic Gillies Limit Township and is located on the west shore of Rib Lake along the Ontario Northland Railway. Rib Lake was the location of a train station in the 1940s.

References

Ontario Northland Railway points